Old Israel (Staroizrail) was a 19th-century sect founded in the 1830s by Perfil Katasonov, a disciple of Abbakum Kopylov, the founder of the Postniki (Fasters) sect, as the result of a schism. Its adherents considered themselves to be the Chosen People establishing the Kingdom of God on earth. The sect disintegrated into various spin-off sects, among them New Israel, at the death of its founder.

References
Daniel H. Shubin, The History of Russian Christianity, Volume III: The Synodal Era and the Sectarians, 1725 to 1894, Algora Publishing (2005), pp. 124ff.
Sergei I. Zhuk, Russia's Lost Reformation: Peasants, Millennialism, and Radical Sects in Southern Russia and Ukraine, 1830-1917, JHU Press (2004), .

Khlysts
Christian denominations in Russia